Sir Peter Bernhard Hirsch HonFRMS FRS (born 16 January 1925) is a British metallurgist who has made fundamental contributions to the application of transmission electron microscopy to metals. Hirsch attended Sloane Grammar School, Chelsea, and St Catharine's College, Cambridge. In 1946 he joined the Crystallography Department of the Cavendish to work for a PhD on work hardening in metals under W.H. Taylor and Lawrence Bragg. He subsequently carried out work, which is still cited, on the structure of coal.

In the mid-1950s he pioneered the application of transmission electron microscopy (TEM) to metals and developed in detail the theory needed to interpret such images. He was a Fellow of Christ's College, Cambridge from 1960 to 1966 and was elected an Honorary Fellow of Christ's in 1978.  In 1965, with Howie, Whelan, Pashley and Nicholson, he published the text Electron microscopy of thin crystals. The following year he moved to Oxford to take up the Isaac Wolfson Chair in Metallurgy, succeeding William Hume-Rothery. He held this post until his retirement in 1992, building up the Department of Metallurgy (now the Department of Materials) into a world-renowned centre. Among many other honours, he was awarded the 1983 Wolf Foundation Prize in physics. He was elected to the Royal Society in 1963 and knighted in 1975.

Hirsch was elected a member of the National Academy of Engineering in 2001 for experimentally establishing the role of dislocations in plastic flow and of electron microscopy as a tool for materials research. He is also a fellow of St Edmund Hall, Oxford.

References

1925 births
Living people
Alumni of Christ's College, Cambridge
Alumni of St Catharine's College, Cambridge
British materials scientists
British metallurgists
Microscopists
Fellows of the Royal Society
Foreign Members of the Russian Academy of Sciences
British Jews
Jewish scientists
Wolf Prize in Physics laureates
Isaac Wolfson Professors of Metallurgy
Fellows of St Edmund Hall, Oxford
Knights Bachelor
Royal Medal winners
Recipients of the Lomonosov Gold Medal
Fellows of the Royal Microscopical Society